

Champions

Major League Baseball
World Series: Kansas City Royals over St. Louis Cardinals (4-3); Bret Saberhagen, MVP

American League Championship Series MVP: George Brett
National League Championship Series MVP: Ozzie Smith
All-Star Game, July 16 at the Metrodome: National League, 6–1; LaMarr Hoyt, MVP

Other champions
Caribbean World Series: Tigres del Licey (Dominican Republic)
College World Series: Miami (Florida)
Japan Series: Hanshin Tigers over Seibu Lions (4-2)
Big League World Series: Broward County, Florida
Junior League World Series: Tampa, Florida
Little League World Series: Seoul National, Seoul, South Korea
Senior League World Series: Pingtung, Taiwan

Awards and honors
Baseball Hall of Fame
Lou Brock
Enos Slaughter
Arky Vaughan
Hoyt Wilhelm
Most Valuable Player
Don Mattingly, New York Yankees, 1B (AL)
Willie McGee, St. Louis Cardinals, OF (NL)
Cy Young Award
Bret Saberhagen, Kansas City Royals (AL)
Dwight Gooden, New York Mets (NL)
Rookie of the Year
Ozzie Guillén, Chicago White Sox, SS (AL)
Vince Coleman, St. Louis Cardinals, OF (NL)
Manager of the Year Award
Bobby Cox, Toronto Blue Jays (AL)
Whitey Herzog, St. Louis Cardinals (NL)
Woman Executive of the Year (major or minor league): Frances Crockett, Charlotte Orioles, Southern League
Gold Glove Award
Don Mattingly (1B) (AL) 
Lou Whitaker (2B) (AL) 
George Brett (3B) (AL) 
Alfredo Griffin (SS) (AL) 
Dwight Evans (OF) (AL) 
Dave Winfield and Gary Pettis (OF) (AL) 
Dwayne Murphy (OF) (AL)
Lance Parrish (C) (AL) 
Ron Guidry (P) (AL)

MLB statistical leaders

1Major League Triple Crown Pitching Winner

Major league baseball final standings

Events

January–April
January 7 – Outfielder Lou Brock and knuckleballer Hoyt Wilhelm are elected to the Hall of Fame by the Baseball Writers' Association of America, with Wilhelm becoming the first relief pitcher ever selected. Second baseman Nellie Fox is named on 295 of the 395 ballots (74.7%), but the BBWAA and the Hall of Fame committee decline to round Fox's percentage to the necessary 75%.
March 6 – Enos Slaughter and Arky Vaughan are elected to the Hall of Fame by the Special Veterans Committee.
March 18 – Commissioner Peter Ueberroth officially reinstates Hall of Famers Mickey Mantle and Willie Mays. The two had been banned from working within Major League Baseball by Ueberroth's predecessor, Bowie Kuhn due to their associations with gambling casinos. 
March 28 – The April 1 issue of Sports Illustrated comes out, including George Plimpton's hoax article on Sidd Finch.
April 11 – Gorman Thomas hits three home runs and drives in six runs to lead the Seattle Mariners to a 14–6 victory over the Oakland Athletics.
April 28 – Only hours after being swept by the Chicago White Sox in a three-game series at Comiskey Park, the New York Yankees fire Yogi Berra as manager 16 games into the season. Yankees owner George Steinbrenner does not fire Berra personally, but instead dispatches general manager Clyde King to deliver the news for him. Berra is replaced by Billy Martin, whom he replaced as manager after the  season. It is the fourth of Martin's five stints as Yankee skipper. Berra vows after the slight to never again set foot in Yankee Stadium as long as Steinbrenner owns the team.

Draft

May–June
May 13 – Against the Philadelphia Phillies at Riverfront Stadium, Tony Pérez of the Cincinnati Reds becomes the oldest player to hit a grand slam. The shot comes in the sixth inning off Dave Rucker with Dave Concepción, Ron Oester and Dave Van Gorder on base and breaks a 3–3 tie; the Reds win by that 7–3 score. Pérez, who will celebrate his 43rd birthday the next day, breaks Honus Wagner's 70-year record as the oldest player to hit a grand slam; Wagner had done so on July 29, at 41 years, 5 months.  Perez' record will be broken 20 years later by 46-year old Julio Franco of the Atlanta Braves.
May 20 – 44-year old player-manager Pete Rose hits his first home run since 1982 in a 6–1 loss to the Chicago Cubs. Ironically, Rose would later hit his final career home run, also against the Cubs, on in a 7–5 win on September 6.
June 6 – In a key game for the American League East, Toronto Blue Jays' pitcher Jimmy Key had a no-hitter broken up in the 9th inning by Detroit Tigers' Tom Brookens. But the Blue Jays regroup and in the 12th inning, Buck Martinez break up a scoreless tie with a game-winning home run to give the Blue Jays a 2-0 win over The Tigers.
June 11 – In a 26-7 romp over the New York Mets, Von Hayes of the Philadelphia Phillies becomes the first player in MLB history to hit two home runs in the first inning of a game. Hayes leads off the bottom of the first with a homer, then hits a grand slam later in the frame. They are the only two home runs hit in the high-scoring affair.
June 13 - Earl Weaver comes out of retirement to replace Joe Altobelli as the new manager of the Baltimore Orioles.
June 16 - The Earl Weaver Baltimore Orioles revival show rolls on as Wayne Gross hit 2 solo home runs, part of the five home runs the Orioles hit that day as they beat the Milwaukee Brewers 9-1.

July-August
July 2 – Pitcher Joe Niekro of the Houston Astros wins his 200th career game, 3–2 over the San Diego Padres. Joe and Phil Niekro join Jim Perry and Gaylord Perry as the only pitching brother combinations to each win at least 200 games.
July 4–5 – In a game at Atlanta–Fulton County Stadium, the New York Mets beat the Atlanta Braves 16–13 in a 19-inning contest that features Keith Hernandez hitting for the cycle, Mets manager Davey Johnson being ejected, and the Braves coming back to tie the game twice in extra innings, most notably in the bottom of the 18th. Pitcher Rick Camp, a career .074 hitter batting only because the Braves have no position players left, hits a solo home run in the 18th to re-tie the game at 11-11. At the end of the game, even though the date/time is July 5, 3:15 am, the Braves go ahead and shoot off their scheduled Fourth of July post-game fireworks for the fans who endure to the end.  Camp struck out to end the game.
July 11 – The Houston Astros' Nolan Ryan becomes the first pitcher to record 4,000 strikeouts, fanning Danny Heep in the sixth inning of Houston's 4–3 win over the New York Mets.
July 15 – Dave Parker wins the first annual All-Star Home Run Derby.
July 16 – The National League beats the American League 6–1 at Minnesota's Metrodome for its 13th win in the last 14 All-Star Games. The San Diego Padres' LaMarr Hoyt allows one unearned run in three innings and is named MVP.
July 20 – Darryl Strawberry collects seven RBIs in the New York Mets' 16–4 victory over the Atlanta Braves at Shea Stadium.
July 23 – At Arlington Stadium, Oddibe McDowell becomes the first Texas Ranger to hit for the cycle as the Rangers defeat the Cleveland Indians 8–4.
August 4
The New York Yankees celebrate "Phil Rizzuto Day" at Yankee Stadium, and retire Rizzuto's number 10.
Tom Seaver of the Chicago White Sox records his 300th career win over the Yankees, regardless of Rizzuto's prediction that the Yankees would deny him that victory.
Rod Carew of the California Angels gets his 3000th career hit; a double off the Minnesota Twins' Frank Viola.
August 5 – Darryl Strawberry hits 3 home runs helping the New York Mets beat the Chicago Cubs 7–2.
August 6 & 7 – All parks go dark for a brief strike. 23 of the 25 missed games are made up before the season ends.
August 10 - Dave Kingman became the 21st player in Major League Baseball history to hit 400 home runs when he hit a two-run home run in the first inning that helped the Oakland A's beat the Seattle Mariners 11–5. It took him 17 days to get 400 after being stuck on 399.
August 15 – Cal Ripken hits his 100th career home run helping Baltimore Orioles beat the Texas Rangers 9–1.
August 20 – Dwight Gooden strikes out a season high 16 in a 3-0 complete game victory over the San Francisco Giants.
It is his 17th victory in a row.

September
September 3 – At Tiger Stadium, Reggie Jackson of the California Angels becomes the first player to hit 100 home runs for three different teams. He hits the milestone home run off Detroit Tiger Bob Stoddard in the ninth inning of the Angels' 14–8 loss; he had homered off Dan Petry earlier in the game, in the fourth inning. Jackson had hit 269 home runs with the Kansas City/Oakland Athletics and 144 with the New York Yankees. 
September 8 – Pete Rose inserts himself into the Cincinnati Reds' lineup as a late addition, and picks up two singles, the second of which gives him 4,191 hits in his career, tying him with Ty Cobb for the career record. Being that the game is at Wrigley Field, the game is eventually called because of darkness after nine innings, resulting in a rare 5–5 tie.
September 11 – Eric Show of the San Diego Padres goes down in history for pitching Pete Rose's historic 4,192nd career hit;  a line drive single to center field. It breaks the tie for the career record which Rose shares with Ty Cobb since September 8.
September 22 – At a hotel bar in Baltimore, the New York Yankees' pitcher Ed Whitson and manager Billy Martin get into a heated argument that spreads to other parts of the hotel.  An ensuing fistfight results in Martin suffering a broken arm and bruised right side, while Whitson suffers a cracked rib and a split lip.
September 24 – At Wrigley Field, Andre Dawson of the Montreal Expos (a future Cub) joins Willie McCovey as the only players to hit two home runs in the same inning twice in their careers. The two home runs come in a 12-run fifth inning that gives the Expos a 15–2 lead against the Chicago Cubs. The Expos hold on to win 17-15 after nearly squandering the 13-run lead, as the Cubs score 13 runs in the last four innings, including five in the ninth; the final out is recorded with the tying run at bat. Dawson also hit two home runs in the third inning of the Expos' 19-0 pounding of the Atlanta Braves at Atlanta–Fulton County Stadium on July 30, .

October–December
October 1 – Ron Darling and John Tudor duel for nine and ten innings, respectively, in this crucial series opener between the New York Mets and St. Louis Cardinals. An 11th inning solo home run by Darryl Strawberry off Ken Dayley is the deciding factor in the Mets' 1–0 victory at Busch Stadium.
October 2 - In game 2 of this crucial series, Dwight Gooden beats The Cardinals 5-2 for his 24th win of the season. The 10 strikeout complete game caps a spectacular season for Goodenn in which the 20-year old finishes the season with the best ERA in baseball (1.53), wins, innings (276.2), strikeouts (268), and complete games (16) and twice he was named National League player of the week, and the 1985 Baseball Digest Player of the Year.
October 6 – Phil Niekro of the New York Yankees becomes the second pitcher this year to record his 300th career win, in a 6–0 shutout of the Toronto Blue Jays.  Although known as a knuckleballer, Niekro did not throw a knuckleball in this game until the final pitch in which he struck out Jays' designated hitter and former Atlanta Braves teammate Jeff Burroughs.
October 19 – Once he took the field for the Royals in Game 1 of the 1985 World Series, Lonnie Smith became the first player in major league history to play in the World Series against a team (St. Louis Cardinals) that traded him away during that same season.
October 27 – The Kansas City Royals burn out the St. Louis Cardinals 11–0 in Game Seven of the 1985 World Series to become only the sixth team to rally from a 3–1 deficit and win the WS. Bret Saberhagen pitches the shutout and wins the Series MVP honors.
October 27 – New York Yankees owner George Steinbrenner dismisses manager Billy Martin for the fourth time. Hired to replace him is rookie manager and former Yankees player Lou Piniella.
November 2 – The Hanshin Tigers defeat the Seibu Lions 9–3 in Game Six of the 1985 Japan Series to notch their only Japan Series win in franchise history.  Tigers' first baseman and triple crown winner Randy Bass is named Japan Series MVP batting .368 with 3 HR and 9 RBI.
November 15 – The Boston Red Sox trade Bob Ojeda, Tom McCarthy, John Mitchell and Chris Bayer to the New York Mets for Calvin Schiraldi, John Christensen, Wes Gardner and La Schelle Tarver.
November 25 – Chicago White Sox shortstop Ozzie Guillén, who hits .273 and has just 12 errors in 150 games, is named American League Rookie of the Year. Milwaukee Brewers pitcher Teddy Higuera, who posts a 15–8 record with 127 strikeouts and a 3.90 ERA, finishes second in voting.
November 27 – Vince Coleman, who steals 110 bases for the St. Louis Cardinals, joins Frank Robinson, Orlando Cepeda and Willie McCovey as the only unanimous winners of the National League Rookie of the Year Award.

Movies
The Slugger's Wife

Births

January
January 4 – Scott Sizemore
January 7 – José García
January 8 – Matt LaPorta
January 10 – Samuel Gervacio
January 12 – Chris Hatcher
January 16 – Junior Guerra
January 16 – Jeff Manship
January 17 – Chad Beck
January 17 – Emmanuel Burriss
January 17 – Jai Miller
January 20 – Fabio Castro
January 20 – Luis Pérez
January 22 – Scott Cousins
January 23 – Jeff Samardzija
January 24 – Niuman Romero
January 24 – Jay Sborz
January 25 – Shane Lindsay
January 28 – Wesley Wright

February
February 1 – Colin Curtis
February 1 – Elian Herrera
February 2 – Scott Maine
February 5 – Eric O'Flaherty
February 8 – Félix Pie
February 12 – Cole De Vries
February 13 – Logan Ondrusek
February 14 – Tyler Clippard
February 15 – Russ Mitchell
February 16 – Clint Robinson
February 19 – Dan Otero
February 20 – Vinnie Pestano
February 20 – Ryan Sweeney
February 25 – Xavier Paul

March
March 2 – Bud Norris
March 2 – Brandon Wood
March 4 – Cory Luebke
March 4 – Michael McKenry
March 5 – Brad Mills
March 9 – Brian Bocock
March 9 – Jesse Litsch
March 12 – P. J. Walters
March 14 – Steven Hill
March 15 – Jon Jay
March 17 – César Valdez
March 20 – Jonny Venters
March 22 – Justin Masterson
March 28 – Mark Melancon
March 30 – Dan Runzler

April
April 1 – Daniel Murphy
April 3 – Mike McClendon
April 3 – Luis Martínez
April 5 – Lastings Milledge
April 5 – Héctor Olivera
April 5 – Ian Stewart
April 8 – Juan Abreu
April 8 – Matt Antonelli
April 9 – David Robertson
April 10 – Jonathan Diaz
April 10 – Clayton Mortensen
April 12 – Brennan Boesch
April 12 – Adonis García
April 15 – John Danks
April 15 – Aaron Laffey
April 23 – Emilio Bonifacio
April 24 – Ryan Reid
April 26 – Sean Rodriguez
April 28 – John Gaub
April 29 – Austin Bibens-Dirkx
April 29 – Chad Huffman

May
May 2 – José Ascanio
May 2 – Jarrod Saltalamacchia
May 2 - David Sutherland
May 3 – Nate Spears
May 10 – Luis Atilano
May 13 – David Hernandez
May 15 – Jim Adduci
May 17 – Todd Redmond
May 18 – Andrew Carpenter
May 20 – Toru Murata
May 21 – Andrew Miller
May 22 – Rick van den Hurk
May 23 – Michael Dunn
May 23 – Matt McBride
May 25 – Brad Lincoln
May 25 – Eric Young
May 26 – Kevin Mulvey
May 26 – Lance Zawadzki
May 30 – Fernando Salas
May 30 – Tony Watson

June
June 3 – Lucas Harrell
June 6 – Trystan Magnuson
June 12 – George Kontos
June 13 – Pedro Strop
June 15 – Michael Fiers
June 18 – Chris Coghlan
June 19 – Blake Parker
June 20 – Brooks Brown
June 25 – Daniel Bard
June 27 – Steve Edlefsen
June 28 – Colt Hynes
June 30 – Pat Venditte

July
July 1 – Chris Perez
July 3 – Greg Reynolds
July 4 – Jared Hughes
July 7 – Leyson Séptimo
July 15 – David Carpenter
July 18 – Ramiro Peña
July 19 – Ernesto Frieri
July 19 – Evan Scribner
July 21 – Wei-Yin Chen
July 21 – Rob Wooten
July 22 – Denis Phipps
July 25 – Alex Presley
July 26 – Mat Gamel
July 28 – Henry Sosa
July 30 – Dylan Axelrod

August
August 1 – Cole Kimball
August 1 – Adam Jones
August 5 – Travis Denker
August 8 – Deunte Heath
August 8 – Blake Wood
August 12 – Zack Cozart
August 12 – Jhonatan Solano
August 13 – Scott Elbert
August 14 – Esmil Rogers
August 14 – Chris Valaika
August 14 - Trent D'Antonio
August 16 – Daric Barton
August 19 – Josh Fields
August 20 – Blake DeWitt
August 20 – Matt Hague
August 22 – Ryan Feierabend
August 22 – Sandy Rosario
August 24 – Christian Garcia
August 24 – Anthony Ortega
August 26 – Eric Fryer
August 26 – Darin Mastroianni
August 26 – David Price
August 28 - Deunte Heath
August 29 – Marc Rzepczynski

September
September 3 – Chris Nelson
September 3 – Troy Patton
September 4 – David Herndon
September 5 – Tyler Colvin
September 6 – Mitch Moreland
September 7 – Wade Davis
September 10 – Matt Angle
September 10 – Anthony Swarzak
September 10 – Neil Walker
September 11 – Bobby Cassevah
September 13 – Lucas French
September 14 – Brandon Hicks
September 14 – Delmon Young
September 16 – Matt Harrison
September 17 – Greg Golson
September 17 – Eric Hurley
September 17 – B. J. Rosenberg
September 19 – Gio González
September 20 – Ian Desmond
September 20 – Kevin Mattison
September 21 – Antonio Bastardo
September 23 – Joba Chamberlain
September 25 – Brad Bergesen
September 25 – Bo Schultz
September 27 – Pedro Ciriaco
September 30 – Dan Robertson
September 30 – Jamie Romak
September 30 – Danny Worth

October
October 1 – Mitch Atkins
October 1 – Darren Ford
October 1 – Jeremy Horst
October 6 – Andrew Albers
October 7 – Evan Longoria
October 7 – Kris Medlen
October 8 – Cody Eppley
October 16 – Enerio Del Rosario
October 17 – José De La Torre
October 17 – Carlos González
October 18 – Yoenis Céspedes
October 23 – Sam Demel
October 25 – Wilkin Ramírez
October 27 – Kyle Waldrop
October 31 – Javy Guerra
October 31 – Andy Parrino

November
November 1 – Paulo Orlando
November 2 – Daryl Thompson
November 4 – Joe Savery
November 7 – Mitch Harris
November 8 – Darwin Barney
November 13 – Asdrúbal Cabrera
November 15 – Duane Below
November 18 – Bruce Billings
November 19 – Brad Harman
November 20 – Chuckie Fick
November 20 – Greg Holland
November 22 – Adam Ottavino
November 23 – Pedro Figueroa
November 26 – Corey Brown
November 26 – Matt Carpenter
November 26 – Jhonny Núñez
November 30 – Luis Valbuena

December
December 1 – Eddy Rodríguez
December 2 - Ernesto Mejía
December 4 – Andrew Brackman
December 4 – Carlos Gómez
December 8 – Josh Donaldson
December 8 – Robbie Weinhardt
December 17 – Fernando Abad
December 19 – Michael Taylor
December 20 – Tyler Sturdevant
December 21 – Ed Easley
December 21 – Matt Mangini
December 21 – Brian Schlitter
December 22 – Daniel Stange
December 24 – Andrew Romine
December 26 – Chris Carpenter
December 30 – Sean Gallagher
December 31 – Evan Reed

Deaths

January
January 16 – Ken Chase, 71, pitcher for the Washington Senators, Boston Red Sox and New York Giants between 1936 and 1943.
January 28 – Bobby Young, 60, second baseman who hit .248 in an eight-year career with the St. Louis Cardinals, St. Louis Browns, Baltimore Orioles and Cleveland Indians from 1948 to 1958.
January 30 – Joe Bradshaw, 87, pitcher for the 1929 Brooklyn Robins.

February
February 3 – Johnnie Bob Dixon, 85, pitched for six Negro leagues teams over five seasons in a period spanning 1926 and 1934.
February 10 – Johnny Mokan, 89, outfielder who hit .291 in 582 games for the Pirates and Phillies between 1921 and 1927.
February 12 – Van Lingle Mungo, 73, All-Star pitcher whose antics delighted Brooklyn Dodgers fans; led NL in strikeouts, shutouts and innings once each.
February 17 – George Washington, 77, outfielder who hit .268 with two home runs for the Chicago White Sox from 1935–36.
February 20 – Syl Johnson, 84, pitcher who posted a 112–117 record with four different teams over 19 seasons (1922–1940), and a member of the 1931 World Champion St. Louis Cardinals.
February 26 – George Uhle, 86, pitcher for the Indians and Tigers who won 200 games and is credited with having developed the slider pitch in the 1920s; also batted .289, one of the highest averages for a pitcher.

March
March 1 – George Banks, 46, third baseman/outfielder who hit .219 in 106 games for the Minnesota Twins and Cleveland Indians from 1962 to 1966.
March 2 – Leslie Green, 71, All-Star outfielder whose career in the Negro and Mexican leagues stretched from 1939 to 1946.
March 8 – Al Todd, 83, catcher for the Phillies, Pirates, Dodgers and Cubs between 1932 and 1943; later a minor league manager.
March 10 – Bill Cooper, 70, left-handed-hitting catcher for four Negro leagues teams between 1938 and 1946.
March 10 – Bob Nieman, 58, left fielder who appeared in 1,113 games for six teams between 1951 and 1962 and batted .300 twice for the Baltimore Orioles; first player to hit home runs in his first two major league at-bats; later a scout.
March 17 – Ike Pearson, 68, pitcher who posted a 13–50 record hurling for two struggling teams, the Philadelphia Phillies (1939–1942 and 1946) and Chicago White Sox (1948).
March 22 – Arthur Allyn Jr., 71, co-owner and club president of the Chicago White Sox from 1961 to 1969.
March 25 – Curt Barclay, 53, pitcher who posted a 10–9 record with a 3.48 for the Giants from 1957 to 1959.
March 25 – Joe Wood, 65, infielder who played briefly for the 1943 Detroit Tigers.

April
April 5 – Hal Totten, 83, Chicago-based sportscaster who did play-by-play for the Cubs and White Sox from 1924 to 1945 and the Mutual Network Game of the Day from 1946 to 1950; also a minor league executive.
April 8 – Joe Sullivan, 74, knuckleballing southpaw pitcher for three teams from to 1935 to 1941, and a member of the 1935 World Champion Detroit Tigers.
April 16 – Benny Zientara, 67, second baseman for the Cincinnati Reds in the 1940s.
April 23 – Bob Wilson, 60, right fielder for the 1958 Los Angeles Dodgers.
April 23 – Whitey Wistert, 73, pitcher for the 1934 Cincinnati Reds, and a World War II veteran.

May
May 1 – Frank Glieber, 51, Dallas sportscaster and longtime CBS-TV NFL announcer who was the television voice of MLB's Texas Rangers from 1978 to 1980.
May 4 – Bill Kunkel, 48, AL umpire since 1968 who worked two World Series and four ALCS; previously a relief pitcher who appeared in 89 games for the Kansas City Athletics and New York Yankees (1961–1963); father of shortstop Jeff Kunkel.
May 5 – Joe Glenn, 76, catcher for the New York Yankees, St. Louis Browns and Boston Red Sox, who caught Babe Ruth during his last pitching appearance in 1933, and also caught Ted Williams in a rare relief appearance in 1940.
May 5 – Charles Shipman Payson, 86, who succeeded his late wife, Joan Whitney Payson, as principal owner of the New York Mets in 1975 until selling the team in 1980 to Nelson Doubleday Jr. and Fred Wilpon.
May 6 – Kirby Higbe, 70, All-Star pitcher for five NL teams who won 22 games for the 1941 Brooklyn Dodgers.
May 6 – Red Peery, 78, pitcher for the Pittsburgh Pirates and Boston Braves between 1927 and 1929.
May 11 – Johnny Bero, 62, shortstop who played in 65 major-league games for the 1948 Detroit Tigers and 1951 St. Louis Browns.
May 11 – Ramón Bragaña, 76, pitcher, catcher and corner outfielder for the 1928 Cuban Stars East of the Eastern Colored League who had a lengthy career in Black and winter baseball; member of the Cuban and Mexican baseball halls of fame.
May 11 – Bud Teachout, 81, pitcher and outfielder for the Chicago Cubs and St. Louis Cardinals from 1930 to 1932.
May 14 – Earl Bumpus, 71, outfielder, first baseman and southpaw hurler for the Kansas City Monarchs, Birmingham Black Barons and Chicago American Giants of the Negro American League between 1944 and 1948.
May 14 – Harry Byrd, 60, All-Star pitcher and American League Rookie of the Year in 1952, who posted a 46–54 career record with a 4.35 ERA for five American League teams.
May 14 – Bill Morley, 95, second baseman for the 1913 Washington Senators.
May 16 – Johnny Broaca, 73, Yale-educated pitcher who posted a 44–29 record with a 4.08 ERA in 121 games for the Yankees and Indians from 1934 to 1939.
May 21 – Archie McKain, 74, left-handed reliever who posted a 26–21 record with a 4.26 ERA and 16 saves for the Red Sox, Tigers and Browns from 1937–43.
May 21 – Grover Powell, 44, left-handed pitcher for the 1963 New York Mets, who hurled a four-hit shutout in his first start but was struck in the face by a Donn Clendenon line drive in his next start and never won another game.
May 23 – Whitey Wilshere, 72, pitcher who posted a 10–12 record with a 5.28 ERA for the Philadelphia Athletics from 1934 through 1936.
May 29 – Billy Zitzmann, 89, outfielder who hit a .267 career average with Cincinnati and Pittsburgh between 1919 and 1929.
May 31 – Jake Early, 70, catcher who hit .241 with 32 home runs and 264 RBI in 747 games for the Washington Senators and St. Louis Browns from 1939 to 1949.

June
June 2 – Dorothy Mueller, 59, All-Star pitcher and a member of three champion teams of the AAGPBL from 1947 to 1953.
June 10 – Bob Prince, 68, nicknamed "The Gunner", legendary radio and television voice of the Pittsburgh Pirates from 1948 to 1975; elected to broadcasters' wing of Baseball Hall of Fame in 1986; also did play-by-play for ABC Monday Night Baseball and the Houston Astros.
June 23 – Alf Anderson, 71, shortstop who played 126 games for the Pittsburgh Pirates (1940–1941 and 1946).
June 26 – Wes Schulmerich, 83, outfielder who hit .289 in 429 games with the Boston Braves, Philadelphia Phillies and Cincinnati Reds from 1931 to 1934.
June 29 – Orville Singer, 86, outfielder for five Negro leagues teams, primarily the New York Lincoln Giants, between 1923 and 1932.

July
July 2 – Guy Bush, 83, pitcher who won 176 games, most with the Chicago Cubs, but was best remembered for having given up Babe Ruth's last home run.
July 4 – Frank Walsh, 79, National League umpire who worked in 344 games between September 1961 and September 1963; umpired in over 4,000 games in organized baseball.
July 14 – Larry Drake, 64, outfielder who played from 1945 through 1948 for the Washington Senators and Philadelphia Athletics.
July 24 – Ted Kleinhans, 86, left handed reliever who posted a 4–9 record with a 5.08 ERA and one save for the Reds, Yankees and Phillies from 1934 to 1938.
July 27 – Smoky Joe Wood, 95, pitcher for the Red Sox who posted a 34–5 record with a 1.91 ERA in 1912, and went on to win three games in the World Series against the New York Giants; after wearing out his arm by age 26 with a record of 117–57, returned as an outfielder with the Indians and batted .366 while platooning in 1921; later coached at Yale for 20 years.
July 27 – Carl Yowell, 82, pitcher for the Cleveland Indians in the 1920s.

August
August 3 – Cloy Mattox, 82, backup catcher who hit a .167 average for the 1929 Philadelphia Athletics.
August 7 – Johnny Rucker, 68, center fielder who hit .272 in 705 games for the New York Giants from 1940-1946, leading his team in at-bats (622), hits (179), doubles (38), triples (9) and runs (95) during the 1941 season.
August 15 – Sam Streeter, 84, Negro league baseball player.
August 16 – Dick Drott, 49, pitcher for the Cubs and Colt .45s from 1957 to 1963, who posted a 15–11 record with a 3.58 in his season debut, ending third in the Rookie of the Year vote behind pitcher Jack Sanford (19–8, 3.08) and first baseman Ed Bouchee (.293, 17 HR, 76 RBI).
August 20 – Clarence Fieber, 71, left handed reliever for the 1932 Chicago White Sox.
August 21 – Roy Luebbe, 84, backup catcher for the 1925 New York Yankees.
August 24 – Boots McClain, 86, infielder who played for seven Negro National League teams over six seasons between 1920 and 1926.
August 25 – Dick Wakefield, 64, All-Star left fielder who played for the Detroit Tigers, New York Yankees and New York Giants between 1941 and 1952.
August 26 – Stu Clarke, 79, backup infielder who hit .273 in 61 games for the Pittsburgh Pirates from 1929 to 1930.
August 27 – Rogelio Crespo, 90, Havana-born infielder who played for the Cuban Stars East of the Eastern Colored League in 1926 and 1927.
August 27 – Johnny Lindell, 68, 1943 All-Star outfielder who hit .273 in a 12-year career; also posted an 8–18 record with a 4.47 ERA as a pitcher; won three World Series rings with the Yankees in 1943, 1947 and 1949.
August 31 – Lefty Smoll, 71, pitcher for the 1940 Philadelphia Phillies.

September
September 4 – Art Bramhall, 74, backup infielder for the 1935 Philadelphia Phillies.
September 5 – Blaine Walsh, 60, sportscaster; member of the Braves' radio or TV broadcast team from 1953 to 1965, the franchise's 13-year tenure in Milwaukee.
September 12 – Steamboat Struss, 76, pitcher for the 1934 Pittsburgh Pirates.
September 21 – George Jefferson, 63, pitcher for the Cleveland Buckeyes of the Negro American League (1944–1945, 1947–1948).

October
October 7 – Philly Holmes, 72, shortstop whose career in black baseball spanned 1937 to 1945, including three years in the Negro American League; brother of Lefty Holmes.
October 8 – Subby Byas, 75, catcher, first baseman and outfielder for three Negro leagues clubs, chiefly the Chicago American Giants, between 1932 and 1942.
October 9 – Tom Cooper, 58, catcher who played for the Kansas City Monarchs of the Negro American League (1947–1952), then in minor league baseball for the Phillies' organization in the 1950s.
October 9 – Rusty Yarnall, 82, pitcher for the 1926 Philadelphia Athletics.
October 14 – Ossie Bluege, 84, All-Star third baseman who spent his entire 50-year baseball career with the Washington Senators/Minnesota Twins; played for 18 seasons (1922–1939), then served as a coach (1940–1942), manager (1943–1947), farm system director (1948–1957) and comptroller (1958–1971).
October 17 – Bud Sheely, 64, backup catcher who hit .210 in 101 games for the Chicago White Sox from 1951 to 1953; son of Earl Sheely.
October 20 – Hal Goldsmith, 87, pitcher who posted a 6–10 record with a 4.04 ERA for the Boston Braves and St. Louis Cardinals from 1926 to 1929.
October 26 – Bob Scheffing, 72, catcher, coach, manager and executive; hit .263 with 20 home runs and 187 RBI in 517 games for the Chicago Cubs, Cincinnati Reds and St. Louis Cardinals between 1941 and 1951; managed Cubs from 1957 through 1959 and Detroit Tigers from 1961 until June 16, 1963; succeeded Johnny Murphy as general manager of the New York Mets upon Murphy's sudden death in January 1970, and served as GM through the 1974 season.

November
November 11 – Roy Lee, 68, left handed pitcher for the 1945 New York Giants.
November 11 – Frank Mulroney, 82, pitcher who had a two-game "cup of coffee" for the 1930 Boston Red Sox.
November 12 – Augie Walsh, 81, pitcher who went 4–10 with the Philadelphia Phillies from 1927 to 1928.
November 14 – Oscar Harstad, 93, pitcher who posted a 3–5 record with a 3.40 ERA in 32 games for the 1915 Cleveland Indians.
November 14 – Luke Nelson, 91, relief pitcher who posted a 3–0 mark with a 2.96 ERA in nine appearances with the 1919 New York Yankees.
November 15 – Riggs Stephenson, 87, left fielder who batted .336 lifetime with 1,515 hits, while usually platooning for the Cleveland Indians (1921–1925) and Chicago Cubs (1926–1934).
November 23 – Sam West, 81, center fielder for the Washington Senators (1927–1932, 1938–1941) and St. Louis Browns (1933–1938) who batted .300 eight times; four-time AL All-Star.
November 25 – Ray Jablonski, 58, All-Star third baseman, mainly with the Cardinals, Reds and Giants, who had 100 RBI in his first two seasons.
November 26 – Monk Sherlock, 81, first baseman who hit .324 in 92 games for the 1930 Philadelphia Phillies.
November 30 – Jim Grant, 91, pitcher for the 1923 Philadelphia Phillies.

December
December 6 – Burleigh Grimes, 92, "Old Stubblebeard," Hall of Fame pitcher who won 270 games, 158 of them for Brooklyn, with five 20-win seasons using the spitball, of which he was the last legal practitioner; later managed 1937–1938 Dodgers and for 14 seasons in minors, and was a longtime scout.
December 8 – Dave Madison, 64, relief pitcher who played from 1950 through 1953 for the Detroit Tigers, St. Louis Browns and New York Yankees.
December 8 – Bill Wambsganss, 91, second baseman for the Cleveland Indians (1914–1923) and member of their 1920 World Series champions, who made the only unassisted triple play in World Series history; also played for the Boston Red Sox and Philadelphia Athletics (1924–1926); later became a manager in the All-American Girls Professional Baseball League.
December 14 – Roger Maris, 51, seven-time All-Star right fielder whose 61 home runs in 1961 broke Babe Ruth's long-standing record, earning him his second consecutive American League MVP award and setting an MLB standard that would last for 37 years; the Yankees, for whom Maris starred from 1960 to 1966, retired his #9 uniform in 1984; three-time World Series champion — 1961 and 1962 with Yanks and 1967 with St. Louis Cardinals — and 1960 Gold Glove winner; also played for Cleveland Indians and Kansas City Athletics during his 12-season (1957–1968) career.
December 17 – Elmer Bowman, 88, pinch-hitter for the 1920 Washington Senators.
December 17 – Ken O'Dea, 72, All-Star catcher who hit a .255 average with 40 home runs and 323 RBI in a 12-year career with three teams, and was a member of the St. Louis Cardinals teams that won the World Series in 1942 and 1944.
December 21 – Joe Genewich, 88, pitcher who went 73–92 with the Boston Braves and New York Giants from 1922 to 1930, who led Major League pitchers with 17 putouts in the 1917 season.
December 26 – Les Bell, 84, third baseman who hit .290 with 66 home runs and 509 RBI in a nine-season career with three teams, and a member of the 1926 World Series champion St. Louis Cardinals.
December 26 – Jim Bilbrey, 61, pitcher for the 1949 St. Louis Browns.

References

External links

Major League Baseball official website 
Minor League Baseball official website
Baseball Almanac – Major League Baseball Players Who Died in 1985